Shingle Creek is an unincorporated community in the southeastern Thompson Plateau of the Southern Interior of British Columbia, named after the stream of the same name, a tributary of the Okanagan River which joins that stream in the city of Penticton.

References

Populated places in the South Okanagan
Unincorporated settlements in British Columbia
Populated places in the Okanagan Country